Emma Meesseman (born 13 May 1993) is a Belgian professional basketball player for Fenerbahçe of the EuroLeague Women and the Chicago Sky of the Women's National Basketball Association (WNBA). After playing basketball in Belgium, Meesseman was drafted by the Washington Mystics with the 19th overall pick in the second round of the 2013 WNBA draft. She has also played for the Belgian international team and several European professional teams. She was named the 2011 FIBA Europe Young Women's Player of the Year and the 2019 WNBA Finals MVP. Meesseman studied physical education at Vrije Universiteit Brussel.

Professional career

Europe

Meesseman's club career began at the age of 16. She played domestically for the Blue Cats, based in her birth town of Ypres, and in the EuroCup for Lotto Young Cats, also in her native Belgium. In her second season with the Blue Cats she was named Belgium Championship MVP, and took the Young Cats to two EuroCups (2010–12).

In 2012, she joined ESB Villeneuve-d'Ascq of the Ligue Féminine de Basketball. In her second year with the club she played in her third EuroCup, reaching the semi-finals before falling to WBC Dynamo Moscow.

Meesseman played for Spartak Moscow from 2014 to 2016, competing in two EuroCup tournaments. In February 2016, she was acquired by UMMC Ekaterinburg.

With UMMC Ekaterinburg, Meesseman won the Russian National League championship in 2016, 2017, 2018, 2019 and 2020. Meesseman and UMMC Ekaterinburg won the 2015–16 EuroLeague, Europe's premium basketball competition for women, in April 2016. Having missed out on the final in 2017 and finished 3rd, Meesseman and UMMC Ekaterinburg won the 2017–18 EuroLeague. Meesseman, averaging 19 points in the Final Four tournament, was elected Final Four MVP. Meesseman and UMMC Ekaterinburg followed this up with further Euroleague wins in seasons 2018–19 and 2020–21. With this 4th victory, Meesseman equaled fellow Belgian Ann Wauters' 4 Euroleague wins.

She signed with Fenerbahçe Safiport on 1st of July, 2022 for EuroLeague Women season.

WNBA
Meesseman was drafted 19th overall in the second round of the 2013 WNBA Draft by the Washington Mystics. In her rookie season, Meesseman was a back-up center on the Mystics' roster, averaging 4.4 points per game and 3.1 rebounds per game in 34 games with 1 start.

In the 2014 season, Meesseman became the starting center for the Mystics and averaged 10.1 points per game and a career-high 6.4 rebounds per game.

In the 2015 season, Meesseman would play outside her natural position after being moved to power forward in the Mystics' starting line-up to make room for Stefanie Dolson at the center position. Meesseman would have a breakout season in 2015, averaging 11.6 points per game, 6.3 rebounds per game, was ranked fifth in blocks per game and also added three-point shooting to her skill set. Meesseman scored a career-high 24 points to go along with 10 rebounds in a loss against the Tulsa Shock on June 19, 2015. She also made her first career all-star game appearance after being voted into the 2015 WNBA All-Star Game.

In 2016, Meesseman signed a three-year contract extension with the Mystics. During the 2016 season, Meesseman would have the best season of her career thus far, averaging a career-high 15.2 points per game and led the league in three-point field goal percentage.

In 2017, after the Mystics traded Dolson to the Chicago Sky, Meesseman continued her role at the power forward spot in the starting lineup. In the Mystics' season opener, Meesseman scored 13 points along with 8 rebounds in an 89–74 victory over the San Antonio Stars. During the 2017 season, Meesseman left the Mystics after the first four games due to overseas commitment to play for her national team during the FIBA world championship qualifying tournament. She returned on May 12, 2017, for practice and was activated to play on the Mystics' roster on June 28, 2017. On July 30, 2017, Meesseman scored a new career-high of 30 points along with 10 rebounds in a 77–70 victory over the Atlanta Dream. The Mystics secured a playoff berth as the #6 seed in the league with an 18–16 record. In the first round elimination game, the Mystics defeated the Dallas Wings 86–76, Meesseman scored 16 points and grabbed 10 rebounds. They advanced to the second round elimination game, where they defeated the #3-seeded New York Liberty, 82–68, advancing to the semi-finals, making it the first time in franchise history where the Mystics have advanced past the second round. Meeeseman scored 5 points and grabbed 5 rebounds in the win. In the semi-finals, the Mystics were defeated by the Minnesota Lynx in a 3-game sweep.

In January 2018, it was announced that Meesseman would sit out the entire 2018 season to play for Team Belgium in the 2018 FIBA Women's Basketball World Cup tournament. Without Meesseman, the Mystics would make a run to the WNBA Finals, but were defeated in a 3-game sweep by the Seattle Storm.

In 2019, Meesseman returned to the Mystics and played most of the season off the bench. With her return and strong contribution off the bench, the Mystics would finish as the number 1 seed with a 26–8 record, receiving a double-bye to the semi-finals. In the semi-finals, the Mystics defeated the Las Vegas Aces 3–1, advancing to the WNBA Finals for the second year in a row. Meesseman's presence and off-the-bench heroics earned her Finals MVP honors as the Mystics defeated the Connecticut Sun in five games. Meesseman became the first European player to be named Finals MVP and only the second international player in league history (the first was Lauren Jackson).

In 2020, the season was delayed and shortened to 22 games in a bubble at IMG Academy due to the COVID-19 pandemic. On August 5, 2020, Meesseman scored a season-high 24 points along with 13 rebounds in a 83–77 victory over the Las Vegas Aces. During the season, the Mystics were shorthanded with key players leaving in free agency and sitting out for health concerns as they finished 9–13 with the number 8 seed. Meesseman had returned to the starting lineup with increased playing time. They would lose 85–84 to the Phoenix Mercury in the first round elimination game.

Ahead of the 2022 season, Meesseman signed with the Chicago Sky, where she will be reunited with her Belgian national teammates Julie Allemand and Ann Wauters (with the latter serving as an assistant coach).

International
Meesseman made her debut for Belgium at the 2011 FIBA Europe Under-18 Championship for Women. In the final, Meesseman led the team to victory 77–49 over France, herself scoring 25 points, and was named tournament MVP. On November 25, 2015, she scored 31 points, made seventeen rebounds and five assists for the women's senior team in a EuroBasket Women 2017 qualifier against Belarus.

In Belgium's quarterfinal Eurobasket 2017 match against Italy, she scored 28 points, had 11 rebounds, five assists, and five blocked shots.

Meesseman led Belgium to a best ever finish in EuroBasket Women 2017, a bronze medal, and was named to the All Star five of the tournament. With this finish in the top 5 of EuroBasket Women 2017, the Belgium women's national basketball team qualified for the 2018 FIBA Women's Basketball World Cup. Before this, the Belgium women's national basketball team had never qualified for a World Championships or the Olympic Games.

Continuing on from her strong performance at EuroBasket Women 2017, Meesseman led the Belgium women's national basketball team to a top finish in group C, besting (then second-ranked team in the world) Spain. The Belgian Cats next beat (the then third-ranked team in the world) France in the quarter-final only to lose against the top-ranked team in the world (USA) in the semi-final. Beaten in the bronze medal game by Spain, the Belgian women registered a 4th-place finish at their first FIBA Women's Basketball World Cup. Meesseman, averaging the most rebounds per game (10.7) and the second most points per game (18.5) at the tournament, was selected to the Tournament All-Star Five.

In 2020 the Belgian Cats, with Meesseman, qualified for the Olympic games in Tokyo. She was later also named the TISSOT MVP at the FIBA Women's Olympic Qualifying Tournament in Ostend. At the 2020 Summer Games, she led the Belgium women's national basketball team to the quarter finals, having defeated Australia and Puerto Rico and lost to China in the poule phase. In the quarterfinals, Belgium then suffered a heartbreaking loss to home team Japan. At the end of the tournament, she was elected to the All-Star Five of the tournament, having posted the best points per game, steals and efficiency in the tournament.

WNBA career statistics

Regular season

|-
| style="text-align:left;"| 2013
| style="text-align:left;"| Washington
| 34 || 1 || 14.7 || .446 || .000 || .810 || 3.1 || 1.2 || 0.5 || 0.7 || 0.8 || 4.4
|-
| style="text-align:left;"| 2014
| style="text-align:left;"| Washington
| 34 || 34 || 27.4 || .520 || .000 || .909 || 6.4 || 2.5 || 1.4 || 1.0 || 1.7 || 10.1
|-
| style="text-align:left;"| 2015
| style="text-align:left;"| Washington
| 34 || 34 || 27.2 || .556  || .462 || .829 || 6.3 || 1.7 || 0.9 || 1.3 || 1.2 || 11.6
|-
| style="text-align:left;"| 2016
| style="text-align:left;"| Washington
| 34 || 34|| 29.3 || .533 || style="background:#D3D3D3"|.448° || .800 || 5.6 || 2.3 || 1.2 || 0.7 || 1.2 || 15.2
|-
| style="text-align:left;"| 2017
| style="text-align:left;"| Washington
| 23 || 21 || 28.4 || .482 || .318 || .870 || 5.7 || 2.8 || 0.9 || 1.5 || 1.7 || 14.1
|-
|style="text-align:left;background:#afe6ba;"|2019†
| style="text-align:left;"| Washington
| 23 || 6 || 23.6  || .552 || .422 || .905 || 4.2 || 3.2 || 0.9 || 0.7 || 1.0 || 13.1
|-
| style="text-align:left;"| 2020
| style="text-align:left;"| Washington
| 20 || 20 || 31.7 || .454 || .289 || .829 || 5.3 || 4.5 || 1.2 || 0.8 || 2.0 || 13.0
|-
| style="text-align:left;"| 2022
| style="text-align:left;"| Chicago
| 36 || 36 || 28.6 || .571 || .342 || .887 || 5.5 || 3.8 || 1.4 || 0.8 || 1.4 || 12.4
|-
| style="text-align:left;"| Career
| style="text-align:left;"| 8 years, 2 teams
| 238 || 186 || 26.1 || .522 || .371 || .854 || 5.3 || 2.6 || 1.1 || 0.9 || 1.4 || 11.5

Playoffs

|-
| style="text-align:left;"| 2013
| style="text-align:left;"| Washington
| 3 || 0 || 12.5 || .455 || .000 || .667  || 1.3 || 1.0 || 0.0 || 1.0 || 1.3 || 4.0
|-
| style="text-align:left;"| 2014
| style="text-align:left;"| Washington
| 2 || 2 || 33.3 || .526 || .000 || 1.000 || 8.0 || 0.0 || 1.5 || 1.0 || 4.0 || 12.5
|-
| style="text-align:left;"| 2015
| style="text-align:left;"| Washington
| 3 || 3 || 33.1 || .379 || .250 || .667 || 6.7 || 1.3 || 0.0 || 1.3 || 1.6 || 9.0
|-
| style="text-align:left;"| 2017
| style="text-align:left;"| Washington
| 5 || 5 || 31.2 || .302 || .231 || .700 || 5.4 || 2.6 || 1.4 || 1.6 || 0.6 || 9.6
|-
|style="text-align:left;background:#afe6ba;"|2019†
| style="text-align:left;"| Washington
| 9 || 3 || 28.2 || .582 || .516 || .824 || 5.6 || 2.4 || 1.1 || 0.9 || 0.9 || 19.3
|-
| style="text-align:left;"| 2020
| style="text-align:left;"| Washington
| 1 || 1 || 35.0 || .533 || 1.000 || .000 || 3.0 || 4.0 || 2.0 || 1.0 || 0.0 || 18.0
|-
| style="text-align:left;"| 2022
| style="text-align:left;"| Chicago
| 8 || 8 || 29.6 || .470 || .300 || .833 || 4.0 || 3.5 || 1.5 || 0.9 || 1.1 || 11.1
|-
| style="text-align:left;"| Career
| style="text-align:left;"| 7 years, 2 teams
| 31 || 22 || 28.5 || .477 || .429 || .787 || 4.9 || 2.4 || 1.1 || 1.1 || 1.2 || 12.7

Personal life
Meeseman's mother, Sonja Tankrey, is a former basketball player. She was the Belgian Women's Basketball Player of the Year in 1983.

Meesseman speaks fluent Dutch, French and English. Meesseman was also born with 50% hearing. She wears hearing devices behind both ears to compensate for her lack of hearing.

Honours and awards

Team

Blue Cats Ieper 
 Belgian National League Champion: 2011-12

ESB Villeneuve-d'Ascq 
 French Cup Finalist: 2013-14

UMMC Ekaterinburg 
 EuroLeague Women winner: 2015-16, 2017-18, 2018-19, 2020-21
 FIBA Europe SuperCup Women winner: 2016, 2018, 2019
 Russian League Champion: 2015-2016, 2016-17, 2017-18, 2018-19, 2019-20
 Russian Cup: 2017, 2019
 RFB Super Cup: 2021
 UMMC Cup: 2016, 2018

Washington Mystics 
 WNBA Finals Champion: 2019

National Team 
 4th place U17 World Cup: 2011
 Winner U18 European Championship Women: 2011
 3rd place EuroBasket Women: 2017
 3rd place EuroBasket Women: 2021

Individual 
 MVP Belgian Pro Basketball League: 2010-11
 MVP U18 European Championship Women: 2011
 FIBA Europe Young Women's Player of the Year: 2011
 WNBA All-Star Game selection: 2015
 Eastern Conference Player of the Week: June 2016
 Most 3 points WNBA: 2016
 Final Four MVP EuroLeague Women: 2017-18
 All-Star Five FIBA Women's Basketball World Cup: 2018
 WNBA Finals MVP: 2019
 Vlaamse Reus: 2019
 Flemish Sportsjewel: 2019
 All-Star Five EuroLeague Women: 2019-20, 2020-21
 TISSOT MVP during the Olympic Qualifying tournament in Ostend: 2020
 Belgian Sportswoman of the year: 2020
 All-Star Five Olympics Woman's Basketball Tournament: 2020
 Top Scorer Olympics Woman's Basketball Tournament: 2020
 All-Star Five European Women Basketball Championship: 2021

References

External links

 
 
 FIBA Europe profile
 Eurobasket.com profile
 
 
 

1993 births
Living people
Belgian women's basketball players
Olympic basketball players of Belgium
Basketball players at the 2020 Summer Olympics
Belgian expatriate basketball people in France
Belgian expatriate basketball people in Russia
Belgian expatriate basketball people in the United States
Centers (basketball)
Belgian deaf people
Deaf basketball players
Sportspeople from Ypres
Washington Mystics draft picks
Washington Mystics players
Chicago Sky players
Women's National Basketball Association All-Stars
Fenerbahçe women's basketball players